The 2000 Belgian Cup Final, took place on 14 May 2000 between Genk and Standard Liège. It was the 45th Belgian Cup final and was won by Genk, coming back from an early goal by Frédéric Pierre to win 4-1.

Route to the final

Match

Details

External links
  
 RSSSF Belgium Cups 1999/2000

Belgian Cup finals
Cup Final